Joel Sánchez Ramos (born 17 August 1974) is a Mexican former professional football defender who last played for Veracruz. He is nicknamed "El Tiburón" Sánchez. He was on the Mexico squad that won the 1999 FIFA Confederations Cup.

A strong central defender, Sanchez made his debut with Guadalajara during the 1991–92 season. He is best known for his time at Chivas, where he won 1997 Verano championship. At Guadalajara, he formed a powerful defensive core alongside Claudio Suárez, with whom he played at both club and international level. After spending a year at rival Club América, he returned to Chivas in 2000. In later years, he played for Veracruz, Dorados, Querétaro, and Tecos.

He was a member of the Primera División at the 1998 FIFA World Cup, playing in the first-round games against Belgium and the Netherlands. In addition, Sanchez represented Mexico at the Copa América tournaments (1997) and (1999), helping the team to third-place finishes on both occasions.

Career statistics

International goals

|-
| 1. || 18 November 1998 || Los Angeles, United States ||  || 2–2 || Draw || Friendly
|-
| 2. || 11 March 1999 || Los Angeles, USA ||  || 2–1 || Win || 1999 Nike U.S. Cup
|-
| 3. || 11 March 1999 || Los Angeles, USA ||  || 2–1 || Win || 1999 Nike U.S. Cup
|}

Honours
Mexico
FIFA Confederations Cup: 1999

External links
 
 

1974 births
Living people
Footballers from Guadalajara, Jalisco
Mexican footballers
Liga MX players
C.D. Guadalajara footballers
Club América footballers
C.D. Veracruz footballers
Dorados de Sinaloa footballers
Querétaro F.C. footballers
Tecos F.C. footballers
Mineros de Zacatecas managers
1997 Copa América players
1998 FIFA World Cup players
1999 Copa América players
1999 FIFA Confederations Cup players
FIFA Confederations Cup-winning players
Mexico under-20 international footballers
Mexico international footballers
Association football defenders
Mexican football managers